The hairy-tailed antsangy (Brachytarsomys villosa) is a species of rodent in the family Nesomyidae. 
It is found only in Madagascar.

References

Brachytarsomys
Mammals described in 1962
Taxa named by Francis Petter